The 2016 Central Missouri Mules football team represents the University of Central Missouri in the 2016 NCAA Division II football season. The Mules play their home games on Vernon Kennedy Field at Audrey J. Walton Stadium in Warrensburg, Missouri, as they have done since 1928. 2016 is the 120th season in school history. The Mules are led by head coach Jim Svoboda, who started his 14th overall season, and seventh at Central Missouri. Central Missouri is a charter member of the Mid-America Intercollegiate Athletics Association, joining in 1924.

Preseason
The Mules entered the 2016 season after finishing with an 8–3 record, overall and in conference play, last season under Svoboda. On August 2, 2016 at the MIAA Football Media Day, the Mules were chosen to finish in second place in both the Coaches Poll and Media Poll.

On August 15, the American Football Coaches Association released the Preseason Division II Poll, landing Central Missouri at No. 20.

On August 22, D2football.com released its Top 25 poll, ranking Central Missouri 10th.

Personnel

Coaching staff
Along with Svoboda, there are 13 assistants.

Roster

Schedule

Source:

Game notes, regular season

Pittsburg State

Fort Hays State

Missouri Western

Emporia State

Northwest Missouri State

Nebraska–Kearney

Missouri Southern

Washburn

Central Oklahoma

Northeastern State

Lindenwood

Game notes, postseason

Harding

References

Central Missouri
Central Missouri Mules football seasons
Central Missouri Mules football